Sergey Alexandrovich Mozgov (born 10 March 1995) is a Russian retired competitive ice dancer. With former partner Betina Popova, he is the 2017 CS Warsaw Cup champion. With former partner Anna Yanovskaya, he was the 2015 World Junior champion, two-time (2013, 2014) JGP Final champion, the 2012 Youth Olympics champion, the 2014 World Junior silver medalist, and the 2015 Russian junior national champion.

Early career 
Mozgov began skating in 1999. His parents introduced him to skating to improve his health. Early in his career, he competed with Sabina Adigamova.

Mozgov and Evgenia Kosigina made their international debut in the 2008–09 season. The following season, they received a Junior Grand Prix (JGP) assignment in Hungary, where they placed fifth. He ended their partnership after they finished 12th at the 2010 Russian Junior Championships.

In the 2010–11 season, Mozgov competed with Tatiana Baturintseva. They received no JGP assignments and parted ways after placing 9th at the 2011 Russian Junior Championships.

Partnership with Yanovskaya 
Mozgov teamed up with Anna Yanovskaya in 2011. They were coached mainly by Svetlana Alexeeva at the Medvedkovo rink in Moscow.

2011–12 season: First season together 
Yanovskaya/Mozgov won the bronze medal at their first Junior Grand Prix event, in Gdańsk, Poland, and then gold in Tallinn, Estonia. Their placements qualified them for the Junior Grand Prix Final, where they placed second in the short dance, third in the free, and took the silver medal ahead of Alexandra Stepanova / Ivan Bukin. After winning the gold medal at the 2012 Winter Youth Olympics, they placed fourth at the 2012 Russian Junior Championships. At the 2012 World Junior Championships, they were third in the short dance. During the free dance the referee stopped their music because Mozgov's left bootstrap had come loose. Yanovskaya/Mozgov finished fourth overall behind American ice dancers Alexandra Aldridge / Daniel Eaton who moved up the rankings and took the bronze medal.

2012–13 season 
In 2012–13, Yanovskaya/Mozgov won a pair of silver medals at JGP events in Austria and Slovenia and qualified for the JGP Final in Sochi, Russia, where they finished fourth. They won the bronze medal at the 2013 Russian Junior Championships.

2013–14 season: First JGP Final title 
In 2013–14, Yanovskaya/Mozgov began their season by taking gold at the 2013 JGP Slovakia in Košice. They won another gold at the 2013 JGP Estonia, qualifying them for their third JGP Final in Fukuoka, Japan. Setting personal bests, Yanovskaya/Mozgov placed first in both segments at the final and won the gold medal ahead of Kaitlin Hawayek / Jean-Luc Baker. After placing second to Stepanova/Bukin at the 2014 Russian Junior Championships, they took the silver medal at the 2014 World Junior Championships in Sofia, finishing second to Hawayek/Baker.

2014–15 season: World Junior title 
Yanovskaya/Mozgov decided to remain in the junior ranks in the 2014–15 season. In addition to Moscow, they also trained in Liepāja in the summer. Mozgov recovered from a knee injury early in the season. In the 2014–15 JGP series, the duo won gold medals in Estonia and Croatia, earning qualification to their fourth JGP Final. At the event, held in December in Barcelona, they outscored Alla Loboda / Pavel Drozd for the gold and stood atop the podium for the second consecutive year. In March, they competed at the 2016 World Junior Championships in Tallinn, Estonia. Ranked first in both segments, they were awarded the gold medal ahead of Lorraine McNamara / Quinn Carpenter.

2015–16 season: Senior debut and split 
Although still age-eligible for junior events in the 2015–16 season, Yanovskaya/Mozgov decided to move up to the senior ranks. Debuting on the Grand Prix, they placed sixth at the 2015 Skate America and 2015 Trophée Éric Bompard. In December, they finished sixth at the 2016 Russian Championships in Yekaterinburg. On 2 May 2016, the Russian media reported that their partnership had ended.

Partnership with Popova 
According to the Russian media, Mozgov has teamed up with Betina Popova.

Popova/Mozgov made their international debut at the 2016 CS Golden Spin of Zagreb where they placed fifth.

2017–18 season 
In 2017–18 season they competed at three ISU Challenger Series competitions. They won the gold medal at the 2017 CS Warsaw Cup with a personal best score of 164.07 points. They also won the bronze medal at the 2017 CS Ondrej Nepela Trophy. At the 2017 CS Finlandia Trophy they placed fifth.

In October 2017 they made their Grand Prix debut at the 2017 Rostelecom Cup where they placed sixth. In December 2017 they competed at the 2018 Russian Championships where they placed fourth after placing fifth in the short dance and third in the free dance.

In May 2018 Anjelika Krylova and Oleg Volkov became their new coaches.

2018–19 season 
Popova/Mozgov started their season in mid September at the 2018 CS Ondrej Nepela Trophy where they won the bronze medal with a personal best score of 170.47 points. In early November they placed seventh at the 2018 Grand Prix of Helsinki. Three weeks later they finished eighth at the 2018 Internationaux de France. In early December they won their second Challenger Series bronze medal of the season at the 2018 CS Golden Spin of Zagreb.

They placed fourth at the Russian Championships for the second consecutive year.

In March, Popova/Mozgov have participated in the 2019 Winter Universiade in Krasnoyarsk Russia. They finished first in the short and second in the free, earning the gold medal with a total of 183.01 points.

2019–20 season 
Popova/Mozgov took time off to heal injuries following their Universiade victory, and then resumed training for the new season.  The two selected "Bohemian Rhapsody" as their free dance music, believing it would be a new sort of material for them.  They placed fourth at the 2019 CS Ondrej Nepela Memorial and then won the bronze medal at the 2019 CS Finlandia Trophy.  Given one Grand Prix assignment, they placed eighth at the 2019 Skate Canada International.

Popova/Mozgov announced their retirement from competition on February 14, 2020.  Mozgov indicated that he might seek a coaching career.

Programs

With Popova

With Yanovskaya

Competitive highlights 
GP: Grand Prix; CS: Challenger Series; JGP: Junior Grand Prix

With Popova

With Yanovskaya

With Baturintseva

With Kosigina

Detailed results
Small medals for short and free programs awarded only at ISU Championships. At team events, medals awarded for team results only.

With Popova

With Yanovskaya

References

External links 

 
 
 

Russian male ice dancers
World Junior Figure Skating Championships medalists
1995 births
Living people
Figure skaters from Moscow
Figure skaters at the 2012 Winter Youth Olympics
Youth Olympic gold medalists for Russia
Universiade gold medalists for Russia
Universiade medalists in figure skating
Competitors at the 2019 Winter Universiade